The Wounded is a Dutch rock band, hailing from Emmen in the province of Drenthe, in the north of the Netherlands. They play a dark and melancholic style of music that is variously described as gothic rock, gothic metal, doom metal and dark wave. They are often compared to bands like Anathema and The Cure.

History
In 2000, The Wounded released their debut, called, The Art of Grief. It was followed, in March 2002, by their second album titled, Monument. Shortly after the release of this album, The Wounded changed their line-up. The only two original members, bass player Andy Haandrikman and singer-guitarist Marco van der Velde, searched for new musicians. After auditioning several musicians, they found a new drummer, lead-guitar player and synth-player: Alwin Schnoing, Sander Wessels and Eduard Dresscher. The Monument album was promoted with a high number of performances with which the band played in most parts of the Netherlands. They also played very successful gigs in other countries such as Belgium and Germany. In the beginning of 2003, The Wounded started to work on their new album and released their third album Atlantic early 2004 on Coldblood Industries' sub-label, Ebony Tears. In August 2016 The Wounded announced the completion of their new album Sunset which was released October 2016, it contained nine songs with a running time of over one hour. The artwork for the sunset album was made by Regina Boersma who also made the artwork for Monument and Atlantic.

Band members
Current line-up
Alwin Schnoing – drums (2002–present)
Andy Haandrikman – bass guitar (1998–present)
Marco van der Velde – vocals, guitar (1998–present)
Eduard Dresscher – keyboards (2002–2008; 2017–present)
Sander Wessels – guitar (2002–present)

Former members
Nick Brockman – bass guitar
Ralph de Vries – drums (1998–2002)
Edwin Pol – guitars (1998–2000)
Jonne Ziengs – keyboards (1998–2002)
Erwin de Jong – guitars (2000–2002)
Harald de Haan – keyboards (2008–2017)

Discography
 1998: Starpeople (demo)
 1999: Live at Stoppelpop (live demo)
 2000: The Art of Grief
 2002: Monument
 2004: Atlantic
 2016: Sunset
 2018: In Silence (compilation)

References

External links
 Official Website
 My Space

Dutch rock music groups
Dutch gothic metal musical groups